Live in Memphis is the fourth home video by Canadian singer Celine Dion. It was released on VHS on 2 November 1998. The concert was filmed live in March 1997 during the Falling into You: Around the World tour in Memphis, Tennessee.

Background
Including previously unreleased live performances from her multi-platinum album Falling into You, this 17 song concert-length program also features a rare performance of "The Power of the Dream" written exclusively for the 1996 Summer Olympics in Atlanta, Georgia, and The Isley Brothers song "Twist and Shout". Dion also performed "River Deep, Mountain High". Although the latter was shown on TV, it was not included on the home video.

Live in Memphis was certified Platinum in Canada and Gold in France and the United Kingdom.

Three songs from this concert: "Beauty and the Beast," "To Love You More" and "Because You Loved Me" were included on the All the Way... A Decade of Song & Video DVD in 2001.

Track listing

Charts

Certifications

Release history

References

1998 video albums
Celine Dion video albums
Live video albums